Acromyrmex heyeri is a species of leaf-cutter ant, a New World ant of the subfamily Myrmicinae of the genus Acromyrmex.

Distribution

This species is found in Paraguay, Argentina, Brazil, and Uruguay.

Description
Acromyrmex heyeri workers construct the colonies nest by thatching together cut grass.  At temperatures ranging from 20–30 °C, workers created more openings in the nest thatch as the internal nest temperature goes up as a method of temperature regulation for the colony.  The workers will close openings in the nest thatch as the air humidity surrounding the nest decreases to reduce water loss for the colony.

Studies using isoenzyme systems MDH, a-GPDH, and AMY show the occurrence of monogyny and polygyny associated or not with polyandry, which indicates that the social organization is colony-specific. The polygyny and polyandry observed are likely to be responsible for the great genotypic diversity of the species colonies. The average inbreeding coefficient per colony is higher in Acromyrmex striatus than in Acromyrmex heyeri, which may reflect the different patterns of production of sexual individuals and nuptial flight of those two species.

Synonyms 
 Acromyrmex gaudens Fowler, 1988
 Acromyrmex lillensis Fowler, 1988
 Moellerius heyeri Forel, 1899

See also
List of leafcutter ants

References

External links

Genetics and Molecular Biology, 25, 2, 173-178 (2002), ''Isoenzyme variation in the leaf-cutting ants Acromyrmex heyeri and Acromyrmex striatus Hymenoptera, formicidae)", Brazilian Society of Genetics
GENETIC VARIABILITY AND SOCIAL STRUCTURE OF COLONIES IN Acromyrmex heyeri AND A. striatus (HYMENOPTERA: FORMICIDAE)

Acromyrmex
Insects described in 1899
Hymenoptera of South America